Chypre ( or ) is the name of a family (or concept) of perfumes that are characterised by an accord composed of citrus top notes, a middle centered on cistus labdanum, and a mossy-animalic set of basenotes derived from oakmoss. Chypre perfumes fall into numerous classes according to their modifier notes, which include but are not limited to leather, florals, fruits, and amber.

History

The term chypre is French for the island of Cyprus. Its connection to perfumery originated with the first composition to feature the bergamot-labdanum-oakmoss accord, François Coty's perfume Chypre from 1917 (now preserved at the Osmothèque), whose name was inspired by the fact that its raw materials came predominantly from Mediterranean countries. Although perfumes in a similar style had already been created in the 19th century (such as Eau De Chypre by Guerlain and Shipr cologne, and "chypre powder" had been known centuries prior to those, 1917 feminine Chypre by Coty was so influential that it inspired many descendants, becoming the progenitor of a whole family of related fragrances sharing the same basic accord, which came to be known as "chypres".

Chypre in popular culture

 Marya -- the protagonist of Jean Rhys's semi-autobiographic debut novel, Quartet (Chatto and Windus, 1928) -- asks a young woman in the Paris demimonde she frequents whether she wears the Coty fragrance Chypre. 
 In Aldous Huxley's Brave New World (1932), the main female character, Lenina Crowne, “dabbed herself with chypre” after drying off from a bath. 
 Raymond Chandler's The Lady in the Lake (Knopf, 1943) also mentions a chypre-scented, monogrammed handkerchief.
 In Lawrence Durrell's Alexandria Quartet (Mountolive, first published in 1958), the protagonist, British diplomat David Mountolive, recognizes the "nervous handwriting" of his one-time lover, Leila Hosnani, on an envelope smelling of chypre.
 In original The Maltese Falcon, the character Joel Cairo seeks the Statue (a dainty but ineffective thug). Cairo goes near Sam Spade, wearing the chypre scent. 
 In the movie version, "chypre" scent is replaced with "gardenia" scent.
 One of the two physical editions of Le Sserafim's Fearless is given the subtitle "Blue Chypre".

Style, concept

The chypre concept is characterised by the contrast between the fresh citrus accord and the woody-oakmoss base; often patchouli is considered an indispensable element as well. The chypre accord is used in both male and female perfumery.

Modern chypre perfumes have various connotations. There can be floral, fruity, green, woody-aromatic, leathery, and animalic notes, but the chypre concept is to be easily recognized by the "warm" and "mossy-woody" base which contrasts the fresh citrus top, and a certain bitterness in the dry-down from the oak moss and patchouli. The chypre accord consists of:
Citrus: singular or blends of Bergamot, Orange, Lemon or Neroli
Oakmoss: mossy and woody
Patchouli: camphoraceous and woody
Musk: sweet, powdery, and animalic. Usually synthetic in modern times.

The composition is usually enhanced with a floral component through rose and jasmine oil.

Animalic notes such as civet can be added to this accord to provide richness, but are less popular in modern perfumery. The most common modifiers to this basic accord include patchouli, bergamot, vetiver, ambergris, sandalwood and labdanum resin.

Sub-families
The chypre fragrances generally fit into the Oriental and Woody family of fragrance wheel classification. They can also be classified into several styles:
Leather and/or animalic chypres, such as Bandit by Robert Piguet (1944), Cabochard by Grès (1959), and Azurée (1969) by Estée Lauder.
Floral chypres, such as Calèche by Hermès (1961), Knowing by Estée Lauder, 1988.
Fruity chypres, such as Femme by Rochas, 1944, Mitsouko by Guerlain, 1917, and Y by Yves Saint Laurent, 1964.
Green chypres, such as Givenchy III by Givenchy (1970), Aliage by Estée Lauder, 1972 and Cuvée Spéciale by Charvet.
Woody-aromatic chypres, such as Aromatics Elixir by Clinique, 1972.
Fresh-citric chypres, such as CK One by Calvin Klein, 1994.

Notable examples of chypre-type perfumes 

 The "Chypre" by Coty (1917) is so well-known its name still can be confused with other perfumes labelled "chypre".

 Krasnaya Moskva is a feminine chypre perfume made in USSR in 1925, known for its strong, excessive sillage.

 One of the most popular chypre perfumes was the original Miss Dior, a floral chypre launched by Christian Dior in 1947. However, the formula was later changed, likely due to issues with the ingredient oakmoss.  

 Since the mid-1980s, Karl Lagerfeld cologne, orange in color, called "Lagerfeld" is a modern chypre scent for both men and women.

Pre-1917 chypres 

 Oakmoss powder was used as a scent in the 16th century, known as poudre de chypre
 Eau De Chypre is a fragrance made by P. Guerlain in 1840 
 The A. Siu and Co. soap factory, based in Moscow, offered a "parfums a la mode" soap package that included "шипръ" soap, as seen at position №677 on this bulk price list from 1904.

 Shipr cologne (Cyrillic spelling: "ШИПР", a transliteration of the French "chypre") is a masculine chypre cologne released by Brocard and Co. (later known as Novaya Zarya) in 1889. This cologne is mentioned in the 1909 poem "Отъезд Петербуржца" by Sasha Chorny. The same cologne can be found in stores and supermarkets of modern Russia.
 Due to similar one-word names, some confusion may take place. Masculine and relatively simple in compound (chypre accord + vanilla) Shipr in Russia is often misattributed as a direct "successor" or a "copy" (or, as a less bold claim, an "adaptation attempt") of Coty's feminine and sophisticated Chypre.
 Since many cosmetic factories in Russia make own colognes/hygienic lotions labelled Shipr (see pic), various factories make colognes of different quality and price. The Shipr by Novaya Zarya costs over one hundred rubles online (in novzar.ru online shop), while the bottle by Abar costs under fifty rubles in retail.

References

Perfumes
Perfumery
History of cosmetics